Cassava (Manihot esculenta) production is vital to the economy of Nigeria as the country is the world's largest producer of the commodity. The crop is produced in 24 of the country's 36 states. In 1999, Nigeria produced 33 million tonnes, while a decade later, it produced approximately 45 million tonnes, which is almost 19% of production in the world. The average yield per hectare is 10.6 tonnes.

In Nigeria, cassava production is well-developed as an organized agricultural crop. It has well-established multiplication and processing techniques for food products and cattle feed. There are more than 40 cassava varieties in use. Cassava is processed in many processing centres and fabricating enterprises set up in different parts of the country.

History
Originally a crop of South America, it was introduced in to Nigeria's southern part during the period of slave trade proliferated by Portuguese explorers and colonizers in the sixteenth century. However, its importance to the country got a boost in the late nineteenth century when more formerly enslaved Nigerians returned to their homeland and introduced processing techniques. Over the years, it has become a major economic sustenance crop and it has attained the status of largest producer in the world with recorded production of 34 million tonnes and is a cash crop of great importance to the people of Nigeria.

Production

In Nigeria, cassava production is well-developed as an organized agricultural crop. It has well-established multiplication and processing techniques for food products and cattle feed. There are more than 40 cassava varieties in use. Though the crop is produced in 24 of the country's 36 states, cassava production dominates the southern part of the country, both in terms of area covered and a number of farmers growing the crop. Planting occurs during four planting seasons in the various geo-ecological zones. The major states of Nigeria which produce cassava are Anambra, Delta, Edo, Benue, Cross River, Imo, Oyo, and Rivers, and to a lesser extent Kwara and Ondo.

In 1999, Nigeria produced 33 million tonnes. As of 2000, the average yield per hectare was 10.6 tonnes.

Cassava is grown throughout the year, making it preferable to the seasonal crops of yam, beans, or peas. It displays an exceptional ability to adapt to climate change,
with tolerance to low soil fertility, resistance to drought conditions, pests, and diseases, and suitability to store its roots for long periods underground even after they mature. Use of fertilizers is limited, and it is also grown on fallow lands. Harvesting of the roots after planting varies from 6 months to 3 years.

In order to increase production, several varieties of cassava have been developed which are pest resistant; production in the country is hampered by problems with green mite, the cassava mealybug, and the variegated grasshopper. Diseases affecting cassava crop are mosaic disease, bacterial blight, anthracnose, and root rot.

Government intervention
Eager to promote self-sufficiency, the government wants to promote the use of cassava while curtailing rice and wheat imports. According to a Nigerian Presidential Initiative of July 2002, the cropped area of cultivation of cassava was proposed to be increased to 5 million hectares by the end of 2010 with a projected annual yield of 150 million tonnes resulting in an annual export earning of US$5 billion. An adopted innovation is the introduction of vitamin A-rich cassava. The federal Government of Nigeria launched a project to introduce pro-Vitamin A cassava varieties to 1.8 million farmers in the country.

The 2002 Presidential Initiative by former president, Olusegun Obasanjo, on composite cassava flour was, however, reversed even before it reached maturity by his successor, President Umaru Musa Yar' Adua.

Special Adviser to the Chairman of the defunct Presidential Committee on Cassava Initiative Programme under the Chief Olusegun Obasanjo’s regime, who also doubles as the Chairman, New Partnership for African Development’s Pan African Cassava Initiative, Mr Boma Angar, argues that the inability to back the Cassava policy with a legislative bill that will survive any government was what killed the Obasanjo initiative.

Boma Angar and Hon. Commissioner Of Agriculture, Ogun State, Engr. Ayo Olubori are of the strong opinion that the new FG Cassava Initiative by President Goodluck Jonathan will suffer the same fate as the old one except backed by a legislative bill.

Uses
Cassava, which is rich in starch in the form of carbohydrate, has multiple uses. It is consumed in many processed forms, in the industry and also as livestock feed. Roots or leaves are made into flours. Flours are of three types, yellow garri, white garri, or intermediate colour, with yellow garri considered the best product in Nigeria. Its other products are as dry extraction of starch, glue or adhesives, modified starch in pharmaceutical as dextrins, as processing inputs, as industrial starch for drilling, and processed foods.

See also
Yam production in Nigeria

References

Bibliography

External links
 Trends and Prospects for Cassava in Nigeria, by S. O. Adamu

Economy of Nigeria
Nigeria
Human rights in Nigeria
Agriculture in Nigeria